The Footlight Club is the oldest continuously-running community theater group in the United States of America, having performed every year since 1877. It is a non-profit organization, incorporated as such in 1927.

Based in the Jamaica Plain neighborhood of Boston, the club currently owns and resides in historic Eliot Hall, which its members purchased in 1889 to provide a home for performances and save the building from demolition.

It currently produces five main shows each season, including one fundraiser, and also hosts member-produced performances under the 7A Series banner, named after the club’s address at 7A Eliot Street.

References

External links
 Official website

Community theatre